Events in the year 1881 in Argentina.

Incumbents
 President: Julio Argentino Roca
 Vice President: Francisco Bernabé Madero

Governors
 Buenos Aires Province: Juan José Romero (until 1 May); Dardo Rocha (from 1 May)
 Cordoba: Miguel Juárez Celman 
 Mendoza Province: Elías Villanueva (until 15 February); José Miguel Segura (from 15 February)
 Santa Fe Province: Simón de Iriondo

Vice Governors
Buenos Aires Province: vacant (until 1 May); Adolfo Gonzales Chaves (starting 1 May)

Events
23 July – A boundary treaty is signed by Argentina and the neighbouring country of Chile.  The treaty is signed in Buenos Aires by Bernardo de Irigoyen, on the part of Argentina, and Francisco de Borja Echeverría, on the part of Chile, with the aim to establish a precise and exact borderline between the two countries based on the uti possidetis juris principle. Despite dividing largely unexplored lands, the treaty lays the groundwork for nearly all of Chile's and Argentina's current 5600 km of shared borders.
date unknown – The depreciated peso moneda corriente is replaced by the paper peso moneda nacional (national currency, (m$n or $m/n) at a rate of 25 to 1, the new currency is used until 1969

Births
19 February – Gabino Coria Peñaloza, poet and lyricist (died 1975)
29 June – Ada Cornaro, actress and tango dancer (died 1961) 
24 December - Delfina Bunge, writer and philanthropist (died 1952)

Deaths
6 October – Paul Günther Lorentz, German-born botanist (born 1835)

References

 
History of Argentina (1880–1916)
Years of the 19th century in Argentina